Kanuhuraa as a place name may refer to:
 Kanuhuraa (Kaafu Atoll) (Republic of Maldives)
 Kanuhuraa (Lhaviyani Atoll) (Republic of Maldives)